Macmillan Carruth (born March 25, 1992) is an American ice hockey goaltender who is currently signed to Danish Metal Ligaen side Herning Blue Fox. He most recently played for UK EIHL side Cardiff Devils. Carruth was selected by the Chicago Blackhawks in the 7th round (191st overall) of the 2011 NHL Entry Draft.

Playing career
On May 24, 2012, the Chicago Blackhawks signed Carruth to a three-year, entry-level contract valued at $750,000 per year.  The Blackhawks assigned Carruth to their minor league affiliate, the Rockford IceHogs, on September 15, 2012. The IceHogs reassigned Carruth to his junior team, the Portland Winterhawks, on October 6, 2012.

Carruth, who has played in the WHL since the 2009–10 season, was rewarded for his outstanding performance during the 2012–13 WHL season by being named to the 2013 WHL West First All-Star Team. He set the franchise record for most wins by a goalie on January 9, 2013 with his 106th win in a Winterhawks uniform.  At that point, he already held several franchise playoff goaltending records as well as the regular season record for wins (42).

At the tail end of the 2013–14 season, Carruth was recalled to Chicago from the AHL's Rockford Icehogs prior to the 2014 NHL playoffs.

On August 17, 2015, after the conclusion of his entry-level contract, Carruth was unable to secure a further contract with the Blackhawks, however remained within the organization in signing a one-year AHL contract with the Rockford IceHogs. In a successful 2015–16 season split between the Rockford IceHogs and the Indy Fuel, Carruth was signed mid-season to another NHL deal with the Blackhawks on February 28, 2016.

As a restricted free agent, Carruth continued his tenure within the Blackhawks by signing a one-year extension on June 14, 2016.

After four seasons within the Blackhawks affiliates, Carruth left as a free agent. Un-signed over the summers, he accepted a professional tryout to attend the Providence Bruins training camp on September 25, 2017. On October 7, 2017, Carruth signed one-year contract with Fehérvár AV19 of the Erste Bank Eishockey Liga (EBEL).

After two seasons in the German DEL2 with Lausitzer Füchse, Carruth signed terms with UK EIHL side Cardiff Devils in July 2021.

After a season in Cardiff, where Carruth posted a save percentage of .937, earned a Second Team All-Star selection and won the Elite League (EIHL) play-offs, he joined Herning Blue Fox for the 2022–23 season.

Career statistics

Awards and honours

References

External links

1992 births
Living people
Fehérvár AV19 players
American men's ice hockey goaltenders
Cardiff Devils players
Chicago Blackhawks draft picks
Florida Everblades players
Herning Blue Fox players
Ice hockey people from Utah
Indy Fuel players
Lausitzer Füchse players
Portland Winterhawks players
Rockford IceHogs (AHL) players
Toledo Walleye players
American expatriate ice hockey players in Wales
American expatriate ice hockey players in Germany
American expatriate ice hockey players in Hungary
American expatriate ice hockey players in Canada
American expatriate ice hockey players in Denmark